Krnci is a small village in the Municipality of Moravske Toplice in the Prekmurje region of Slovenia.

There is a small chapel in a free-standing belfry in the cemetery outside the village.

References

External links
Krnci on Geopedia

Populated places in the Municipality of Moravske Toplice